Pleasant Plains is a hamlet of the Town of Clinton in Dutchess County, New York, United States. It is located along Dutchess County Road 14 east of DeWitt Clinton, and west of Clinton Corners.

References

 

Hamlets in New York (state)
Poughkeepsie–Newburgh–Middletown metropolitan area
Hamlets in Dutchess County, New York